Malast is a surname. Notable people with the surname include:

Kevin Malast (born 1986), American football player
Mike Malast (born 1983), American sports agent